The 2019 Mountain West Conference Championship Game was a college football game played on Saturday, December 7, 2019, at Albertsons Stadium in Boise, Idaho, to determine the 2019 champion of the Mountain West Conference (MW). The game featured the Mountain division champions Boise State and the West division champions Hawaii, and was the conference's seventh championship game.

Previous season
The 2018 Mountain West Conference Football Championship Game featured Mountain Division champion Boise State against West Division champion Fresno State in the conference's sixth championship game. The Bulldogs upset the Broncos in overtime.

Teams
The 2019 MW Conference Championship Game was contested by the Boise State Broncos, Mountain Division champions, and the Hawaii Rainbow Warriors, West Division champions. The teams have met 16 times previously, with Boise State holding a 13–3 edge in the series. The teams' last meeting came earlier this 2019 season; Boise State won, 59–37. Hawaii's last victory in the series came in 2007, when they defeated BSU 39–27. This will be the teams' first meeting in the MW Championship.

Boise State
Boise State clinched its spot in the Championship Game after its November 23 win over Utah State. This is Boise State's third consecutive and fourth overall appearance in the Championship Game. Boise State continues to represent the Mountain division for three consecutive MW Championship Games since the first game in 2013 and the first school to host the game for three years in a row. The Broncos compiled a 2–1 record in the game, winning in 2014 and in 2017.

Hawaii
Hawaii earned its spot after clinching the West Division title on November 23 with a win over San Diego State. This will be Hawaii's first appearance in the title game.

Game summary

Statistics

See also

List of Mountain West Conference football champions

References

Championship
Mountain West Conference Football Championship Game
Boise State Broncos football games
Hawaii Rainbow Warriors football games
December 2019 sports events in the United States
Mountain West Conference Football Championship